Sibbeh (also spelled Sebbeh) is a small town in northwestern Syria, located  northeast of Safita in the Tartus Governorate. It is situated atop two hills and the valley between them, in the Syrian coastal mountain range. Nearby localities Mashta al-Helu and al-Kafrun to the south, Duraykish to the west, Wadi al-Oyun to the northwest and Ayn al-Shams to the northeast.

According to the Syria Central Bureau of Statistics (CBS), Sibbeh had a population of 3,061 in the 2004 census. It is the administrative center of the Sibbeh subdistrict (nahiyah) which consisted of six localities with a collective population of 7,614.

References

Populated places in Safita District
Towns in Syria
Alawite communities in Syria